Trichalophus is a genus of broad-nosed weevils in the beetle family Curculionidae. There are more than 50 described species in Trichalophus.

Species
These 58 species belong to the genus Trichalophus:

 Trichalophus albonotatus (Motschulsky, 1860)
 Trichalophus alternans (Say, 1831)
 Trichalophus alternatus (Say, 1831)
 Trichalophus arcuatus Fall, 1907
 Trichalophus arrogatus (Faust, 1883)
 Trichalophus arrogatusurbanus (Faust, 1883)
 Trichalophus boeberi (Schoenherr, 1826)
 Trichalophus brunneus Van Dyke, 1927
 Trichalophus caudiculatus (Fairmaire, 1886)
 Trichalophus cinereus (Ballion, 1878)
 Trichalophus constrictus (LeConte, 1857)
 Trichalophus didymus (LeConte, 1856)
 Trichalophus eximius (Faust, 1885)
 Trichalophus ferganensis Reitter, 1913
 Trichalophus foveirostris Chittenden, 1925
 Trichalophus globicollis Reitter, 1913
 Trichalophus granicollis (Van Dyke, 1927)
 Trichalophus humeralis (Gebler, 1834)
 Trichalophus hylobinus (LeConte, 1876)
 Trichalophus incarinatus Reitter, 1913
 Trichalophus juldusanus Reitter, 1913
 Trichalophus kashgarensis (Faust, 1887)
 Trichalophus korotyaevi Zherikhin & Nazarov, 1990
 Trichalophus krauseanus Bajtenov, 1975
 Trichalophus latefasciatus Reitter, 1913
 Trichalophus lentus (Faust, 1883)
 Trichalophus leucon (Mannerheim, 1834)
 Trichalophus lineatus (Gebler, 1841)
 Trichalophus lituratus (Faust, 1881)
 Trichalophus lixomorphus Bajtenov, 1974
 Trichalophus maklini (Faust, 1890)
 Trichalophus marginatus (Faust, 1886)
 Trichalophus multivittatus Reitter, 1913
 Trichalophus nigrofemoralis Reitter, 1913
 Trichalophus nutakkanus Kono, 1936
 Trichalophus ocularis Reitter, 1913
 Trichalophus pacatus (Faust, 1890)
 Trichalophus planirostris LeConte, 1876
 Trichalophus pubifer Reitter, 1913
 Trichalophus quadrifasciatus Faust, 1881
 Trichalophus quadriguttatus (Gebler, 1829)
 Trichalophus quadripunctatus Kraatz, 1884
 Trichalophus regularis Reitter, 1913
 Trichalophus rubripes Zherikhin & Nazarov, 1990
 Trichalophus rudis (Boheman, 1842)
 Trichalophus scylla Grebennikov, 2015
 Trichalophus seminudus Van Dyke, 1938
 Trichalophus seriatus (Mannerheim, 1853)
 Trichalophus simplex LeConte, 1876
 Trichalophus siplex Leconte, 1876
 Trichalophus stefanssoni Leng, 1919
 Trichalophus steffansoni Leng, 1919
 Trichalophus subcostatus (Ballion, 1878)
 Trichalophus subnudus (Faust, 1885)
 Trichalophus sulcirostris (Ballion, 1878)
 Trichalophus tibetanus (Suvorov, 1915)
 Trichalophus vittatoides Reitter, 1913
 Trichalophus vittatus (Faust, 1881)

References

Further reading

 
 
 
 

Entiminae
Articles created by Qbugbot